Thomas W. Farley (born December 10, 1975) is an American banker. He serves as the CEO of Far Point Acquisition Corp. He previously served as the president of the NYSE Group, including the New York Stock Exchange.

Early life
Thomas W. Farley was born December 10, 1975. He graduated from Gonzaga College High School as a member of the class of 1993. He graduated from Georgetown University, where he received a Bachelor of Arts degree in political science. He received a Chartered Financial Analyst certification from the CFA Institute.

Career
Farley worked for Montgomery Securities, an investment bank, and Gryphon Investors, a private equity firm. He served as the chief financial officer, chief operating officer and later president of SunGard Kiodex, the derivatives advisory subsidiary of SunGard.

Farley became the president of the Intercontinental Exchange (ICE) and chief operating officer of the ICE Futures U.S. in 2007. He later served as senior vice president of financial markets at the ICE.

Farley served as the chief operating officer of the NYSE Group from November 2013 to May 2014. He served as its president from 2014 to 2018. He is a proponent of keeping its equity trading floor.

Personal life 
Farley, with his wife Molly Glynn, has three daughters. Farley contracted COVID-19 in March 2020, but has since recovered.

Thomas is not related to actor Chris despite the fact that they both have the same surname.

References

Living people
1975 births
Georgetown College (Georgetown University) alumni
Gonzaga College High School alumni
Businesspeople from New York City
American business executives
CFA charterholders
Presidents of the New York Stock Exchange